The Whirinaki River is a river of the Northland Region of New Zealand's North Island. It flows northwest from the Waima Forest through the settlement of Whirinaki to the Hokianga Harbour.

See also
List of rivers of New Zealand

References

Far North District
Rivers of the Northland Region
Rivers of New Zealand